This is a list of notable alumni, faculty and admins of the University of the Punjab, located in Lahore, Punjab, Pakistan.

Notable alumni

A
 Allama Iqbal
 Fauzia Abbas
 Ghulam Ahmad
 Ishfaq Ahmad
 Masud Ahmad
 Mirza Tahir Ahmad
 Mushtaq Ahmad
 Muhammad Ahsan
 Choudhary Rahmat Ali
 Arif Alvi
 Akhtar Aly Kureshy
 Chaudry Mohammad Aslam?
 Jagannath Azad
 Ali Baqar Najafi
 Farooq Azam
 Sartaj Aziz

B
 Muneer Ahmed Badini - novelist and writer
 Noor Muhammad Butt - nuclear physicist

D
 Nighat Dad
 Colin David
 Joseph R. D'Cruz
 Satish Dhawan
 DJ Fluke

G
 Yousaf Raza Gillani

H
Alamgir Hashmi - poet
 Javed Hashmi - politician
 Mehr Abdul Haq - philologist
 Javid Husain - diplomat, former Ambassador of Pakistan

I
 Ibn-e-Insha
 Muzaffar Iqbal
 Inder Kumar Gujral

J
 Asma Jahangir

K
 Mujahid Kamran
 Siddiq Khan Kanju
 Abdul Matin Khan
 Hamid Nawaz Khan
 Saif-ur-Rehman Khan
 Wasiullah Khan
 Shaista Khilji
 Har Gobind Khorana
 Safdar Kiyani

M
 Mian Muhammad Mansha
 Musadik Malik-Senator PML-N Politician
 Allama Mashriqi
 Khalid Masud
 Salim Mehmud
 Amir Mir - investigative journalist
 Hamid Mir
 Muhammad Munawwar Mirza
 Mohammed Rafique Mughal
 Noor Muhammad
 Ghulam Murtaza

N
 Niaz Ahmad Akhtar
 Ihsan H. Nadiem
 Anwar Nasim
 Zafar Moeen Nasir
 Hassan Nisar
 Farzana Naz (Renowned Poet)

P
 Anwar Kamal Pasha
 Moeed Pirzada
 Fatima Begum (politician)

Q
 Mazhar Mahmood Qurashi
 Moeenuddin Ahmad Qureshi

R
 Farzana Raja
 Mohan Rakesh
 Mumtaz Hamid Rao
 Muneer Ahmad Rashid
 Mohsin Razi

S
 Abdus Salam - Nobel Laureate, helped develop the Standard Model, laying the foundation for the "God particle" 
 Dalip Singh Saund
 Syed Zakir Hussain Shah
 Kalsoom Nawaz Sharif
 Muhammad Sharif
 Ralph Randles Stewart
 Rahman Syed
 Sanaullah Amritsari

T
 Muhammad Tahir-ul-Qadri
 Muhammad Rafiq Tarar

W
 Syed Waqar Jaffry

Y
 Yash Pal
 Yusril Ihza Mahendra

Z
 Anwer Zahidi
 Zubair Ali Zai

Noted PU faculty 
(Some of the alumni listed above also served in the U of the Punjab faculty, so their names are not repeated here)
 Anwaar Ahmad
 Anna Molka Ahmed
 GF Bruce
 Mian Shah Din
 Oliver Elton
 Kanwal Ameen
 E.M. Forster
 Omar Asghar Khan
 Gottlieb Wilhelm Leitner
 Ishtiaq Hussain Qureshi
 Sir Ganga Ram
 Alfred Cooper Woolner

See also 
 List of people from Lahore
 Higher education in Pakistan
 Higher Education Commission of Pakistan

References

Punjab
 
Lahore-related lists